The year 2009 was the 228th year of the Rattanakosin Kingdom of Thailand. It was the 64th year in the reign of King Bhumibol Adulyadej (Rama IX), and is reckoned as year 2552 in the Buddhist Era.

Incumbents
King: Bhumibol Adulyadej 
Crown Prince: Vajiralongkorn
Prime Minister: Abhisit Vejjajiva
Supreme Patriarch: Nyanasamvara Suvaddhana

Events

March
Miss Thailand Universe 2009 was held in Bangkok. Chutima Durongdej won the beauty pageant.

April
2009 Thai political unrest ended in April. Protesters were criticizing the government.

May
2009 Asian Wrestling Championships were held in Pattaya from May 2 to May 7.

June
2009 Thailand standoff took place in Yala, Thailand on June 27.

July

 30 July: Death Happens, a Thai language horror film is released.

October
2009 PTT Thailand Open ended on October 4. Giles Simon won the singles tournament and  Eric Butorac and Rajeev Ram won the doubles tournament.
Thai Port F.C. won the 2009 Thai FA Cup Final on October 23.

Births

Deaths

See also
 2009 Thai Premier League
 2009 Thai Division 1 League
 2009 in Thai football
 2009 Thai political unrest
 2009 Thailand national football team results
 2009 Thailand National Games
 2009 in Thai television
 List of Thai films of 2009

References

External links
Year 2009 Calendar - Thailand

 
Years of the 21st century in Thailand
Thailand